Pearn is a surname. Notable people with this surname include:

 Cole Pearn (born 1982), Canadian driver
 Inez Pearn (1913–1976), British novelist
 Jon Pearn, English house music producer
 Kris Pearn, Canadian animation director
 Mark Pearn (born 1977), English field hockey player
 Nancy Pearn, founder of Pearn, Pollinger & Higham
 Perry Pearn (born 1951), Canadian ice hockey coach

As a given name
 Pearn P. Niiler (1937–2010), American oceanographer